The Ligue nationale de basket (LNB; English: National Basketball League) is the governing body of men's professional club basketball in France. The LNB organises the first-tier Pro A and the second-tier Pro B. Additionally, the federation annually organises the Leaders Cup, Match des Champions and LNB All-Star Game. The LNB was established in 1987 by a committee consisting of high level professional clubs from France. In 1990, the LNB overtook the CCHN as the organizer of the top tier competition in France.

List of presidents
1987–1999: Jean Bayle-Lespitau
1999–2003: Alain Pelletier
2003–2010: René Le Goff
2010–2011: Jean-Luc Desfoux
2011–present: Alain Béral

See also
LNB Pro A
LNB Pro B
LNB All-Star Game
List of basketball clubs in France

References

External links
Official Site 

  
Basketball governing bodies in Europe
 
Basketball